Mount Crandell is a  mountain summit located in Waterton Lakes National Park, in the Canadian Rockies of Alberta, Canada. It is situated immediately north of the Waterton townsite. Its nearest higher peak is Bertha Peak,  to the south-southwest.

History

Mount Crandell was named in 1914 after Edward H. Crandell who was one of Calgary's first oilmen. 

The mountain's toponym was officially adopted in 1943 by the Geographical Names Board of Canada.

Geology

Like other mountains in Waterton Lakes National Park, Mount Crandell is composed of sedimentary rock laid down during the Precambrian to Jurassic periods. Formed in shallow seas, this sedimentary rock was pushed east and over the top of younger Cretaceous period rock during the Laramide orogeny.

Climate
Based on the Köppen climate classification, Mount Crandell is located in a subarctic climate zone with cold, snowy winters, and mild summers. Winter temperatures can drop below −20 °C with wind chill factors below −30 °C. Precipitation runoff from Mount Crandell drains into Waterton Lake, thence Waterton River.

See also

Geology of Alberta
Alberta's Rockies

References

External links
 Parks Canada web site: Waterton Lakes National Park

Waterton Lakes National Park
Alberta's Rockies
Two-thousanders of Alberta